Anna Ciocchetti Millán (born June 24, 1968, in Madrid) is a Spanish-born Mexican actress and singer.

Early life and education 
Her father Franco Ciocchetti was a jazz musician and she started as a singer with the band Dinamita. She later studied drama with Héctor Mendoza, at Vercelli Drama School and the Royal Academy of London.

Filmography

 2020 : Sin Miedo a la verdad: Brigadier 
2019 : La Reina del Sur 2 : Marietta Lancaster
 2017 : Érase una vez : Lucía (Episode: Blanca Nieves)
 2017 : Caer en tentación : Azucena
 2017 : Hoy voy a cambiar : Fanny Schatz
 2016 : Despertar contigo : Cynthia Madrigal / Isaura Hidalgo de Reyna
 2013 : Prohibido Amar : Alicia Cosío
 2013 : Fortuna : Minerva Constant de Altamirano
 2011 : Huérfanas : Lourdes de la Peña
 2010 : La Loba : Maria Segovia / Lucrecia Argones
 2008 : Vuélveme A Querer : Lorenza Montesinos
 2007 : Cambio de vida
 2007 : Mientras Haya Vida
 2006 : Así del precipicio : Sandra Romano
 2006 : Campeones de la vida : Miriam
 2006 : Sexo, amor y otras perversiones 2
 2006 : El mago Manani
 2005 : Corazón partido : Fernanda
 2005 : Bodas de oro : Sharon
 2005 : Por eso no tienes novio
 2004 : Cero y van 4 : Mónica
 2004 : Belinda : Lucrecia Arismendi
 2003 : Mirada de mujer: El regreso : Sara
 2003 : El pez dorado
 2001 : Lo que es el amor : Anabel Cantú
 2000 : Todo por amor : Regina
 1998 : La chacala : Marina
 1996 : Nada personal : Elsa Grajales
 1996 : A flor de piel
 1995 : El callejón de los milagros
 1994 : Entre vivos y muertos
 1993 : Televiteatros
 1986 : La telaraña

External links
 

1968 births
Living people
Actresses from Madrid
20th-century Mexican actresses
21st-century Mexican actresses
Mexican women singers
Spanish emigrants to Mexico
Spanish people of Italian descent
Mexican people of Italian descent